The 337th Flight Test Squadron was most recently part of the 46th Test Wing and based at McClellan Air Force Base, California. It performed depot acceptance testing until being inactivated with the closure of McClellan on 13 July 2001.

History

World War II
Activated in 1942 at Keflavik, Iceland, equipped with Lockheed P-38 Lightnings. Mission was to intercept and destroy German planes that on occasion attempted to attack Iceland or that appeared in that area on reconnaissance missions.  Returned to the United States in November 1942 as a IV Fighter Command Lightning Replacement Training Unit (RTU).  Trained P-38 pilots in California and Washington State until phaseout of Lightning training in March 1944.

Air defense
Reactivated in 1953 as an Air Defense Command interceptor squadron. Performed air defense mission over Minneapolis and Upper Midwest United States, 1953–1955 with Northrop F-89D Scorpions.  Reassigned to air defense of Boston and New England with North American F-86D Sabres.  In 1957 began re-equipping with the North American F-86L Sabre, an improved version of the F-86D which incorporated the Semi Automatic Ground Environment, or SAGE computer-controlled direction system for intercepts.  The service of the F-86L destined to be quite brief, since by the time the last F-86L conversion was delivered, the type was already being phased out in favor of supersonic interceptors.

Received new Lockheed F-104A Starfighter interceptor aircraft in early 1958, the third ADC squadron to receive the F-104.  In addition, the squadron received the two-seat, dual-control, combat trainer F-104B. The performance of the F-104B was almost identical to that of the F-104A, but the lower internal fuel capacity reduced its effective range considerably.   However, the F-104A was not very well suited for service as an interceptor. Its low range was a problem for North American air defense, and its lack of all-weather capability made it incapable of operating in conjunction with the SAGE (Semi-Automatic Ground Environment) system.  Service with the ADC was consequently quite brief, and the F-104As of the 337th were transferred to the Air National Guard.

With the transfer of the Starfighters, ADC shut down operations at Westover Air Force Base and the 337th was inactivated in July 1960.

Tactical fighter operations
Reactivated as a McDonnell F-4 Phantom II tactical fighter squadron at Seymour Johnson Air Force Base in 1982–1985.

Flight test operations
The 2874th Test Squadron was activated as a flight test squadron as part of the Sacramento Air Logistics Center at McClellan Air Force Base, California in January 1988. It conducted flight tests on aircraft returning to active service after depot maintenance, modification, or repair.  In 1992, the squadron was consolidated with the 337th Tactical Fighter Squadron as the 337th Test Squadron It was inactivated with the closure of McClellan.

Lineage
 337th Tactical Fighter Squadron
 Constituted as the 337th Fighter Squadron on 29 August 1942
 Activated on 11 September 1942
 Redesignated: 337th Fighter Squadron (Twin Engine) on 1 July 1942
 Redesignated: 37th Fighter Squadron, Two Engine on 5 February 1944
 Disbanded on 31 March 1944
 Reconstituted, and redesignated 337th Fighter-Interceptor Squadron, on 23 March 1953
 Activated on 8 July 1954
 Discontinued on 8 July 1960
 Redesignated 337th Tactical Fighter Squadron on 11 December 1981
 Activated on 1 April 1982
 Inactivated on 1 July 1985
 Consolidated with the 2874th Test Squadron as the 337th Test Squadron on 1 October 1992

 337th Flight Test Squadron
 Designated as the 2874th Test Squadron and activated, on 15 January 1988
 Consolidated with the 337th Tactical Fighter Squadron as the 337th Test Squadron on 1 October 1992
 Redesignated 337th Flight Test Squadron on 1 March 1994
 Inactivated: 13 July 2001

Assignments
 342d Composite Group, 11 September 1942
 329th Fighter Group, November 1942-31 March 1944
 514th Air Defense Group, 8 July 1954
 4707th Air Defense Wing, 18 August 1955
 4622d Air Defense Wing (later, Boston Air Defense Sector), 18 October 1956
 4729th Air Defense Group, 8 July 1957
 Boston Air Defense Sector, 25 June 1958 – 8 July 1960
 4th Tactical Fighter Wing, 1 April 1982 – 1 July 1985
 Sacramento Air Logistics Center, 15 January 1988
 Air Force Development Test Center, 1 July 1994
 46th Operations Group, 1 July 1994 – 13 July 2001

Stations
 Keflavik, Iceland 11 September-26 November 1942
 Glendale Airport, California, 26 November 1942
 Muroc Army Air Base, California, 1 March 1943
 Glendale Airport, California, 6 May 1943
 Paine Field, Washington, 12 August 1943
 Glendale Airport, California, c. 2 November 1943
 Ontario Army Air Field, California, 29 December 1943 – 31 March 1944
 Minneapolis-St Paul International Airport, Minnesota, 8 July 1954
 Westover Air Force Base, Massachusetts, 18 August 1955 – 8 July 1960
 (operated from Taoyuan Air Base, Taiwan, December 1958 – March 1959)
 Seymour Johnson Air Force Base, North Carolina, 1 April 1982 – 1 July 1985
 McClellan Air Force Base, California, 15 January 1988 – 13 July 2001

Aircraft

 Lockheed P-38 Lightning, 1942–1944
 Northrop F-89D Scorpion, 1954–1955
 North American F-86D Sabre, 1955–1957
 North American F-86L Sabre Interceptor, 1957–1958
 Lockheed F-104A Starfighter, 1958–1960
 McDonnel F-4E Phantom II, 1982–1985
 General Dynamics F-111 Aardvark

Commanders

 Lt Col Tad Oelstrom, 1982–1984

References

Notes
 Explanatory notes

 Citations

Bibliography

 
 
 
 
 

337